Eryk Ryan Anders (born April 21, 1987) is an American professional mixed martial artist and former American football linebacker. He competes in the Middleweight division of the UFC. He played college football at the University of Alabama.

Early life
Eryk Anders was born on a U.S. Air Force base in the Philippines, where his mother was stationed at the time. When Anders was a sophomore in high school he moved to San Antonio, Texas, where he played football for Smithson Valley High School.

Football career

After graduating from Smithson Valley High School Anders started at the University of Alabama in 2006. From 2006 to 2009, Anders played for the Crimson Tide as a linebacker, starting 14 games in his senior season. His career at Alabama culminated with a victory in the 2009 BCS National Championship against the Texas Longhorns, a game in which he led the Crimson Tide with seven tackles and a forced fumble.

After college he signed a contract with the Cleveland Browns of the NFL. He also had stints in the Canadian Football League and the Arena Football League before beginning a career in mixed martial arts.

Even several years into his MMA career, Anders keeps in touch with Nick Saban, having the coach as a life coach of sorts, helping guide Anders in life, financially and being responsible.

Mixed martial arts career

Early career
Anders began his mixed martial arts career in 2012 as an amateur, participating in 22 amateur bouts, although his official record is listed as 13-3-1 before his professional debut against Josh Rasberry on August 22, 2015, for Strike Hard Productions. He defeated Rasberry in just 40 seconds via TKO.

In his second professional fight, Anders defeated Demarcus Sharpe by unanimous decision.

Anders defeated Garrick James by TKO.

Anders next defeated Dekaire Sanders by submission via rear naked choke.

For his fifth professional fight he defeated Jesse Grun via TKO due to punches.

Bellator MMA
Anders made his Bellator debut on October 21, 2016, defeating Brian White by TKO in 23 seconds.

Legacy Fighting Alliance
Anders next joined Legacy Fighting Alliance. He defeated Jon Kirk by TKO at LFA 6 on March 10, 2017.

On June 23, 2017, Anders fought for the Legacy Fighting Alliance middleweight championship at LFA 14. He defeated Brendan Allen via unanimous decision to win the title.

Ultimate Fighting Championship
Anders made his UFC debut against Rafael Natal at UFC on Fox: Weidman vs. Gastelum, as a late replacement for Alessio Di Chirico who was forced to withdraw due to a neck injury. He won the fight via knockout in the first round.

Anders was expected to face John Phillips on December 9, 2017, at UFC Fight Night 123. However, Phillips was removed from the card and was replaced by promotional newcomer Markus Perez on December 9, 2017, at UFC Fight Night 123. Anders won the fight by unanimous decision.

Anders faced Lyoto Machida on February 3, 2018, at UFC Fight Night 125. He lost the fight via controversial split decision. 16 of 23 media outlets scored the fight for Anders.

Anders faced Tim Williams on August 25, 2018, at UFC Fight Night 135. He won the fight via knockout due to a head kick in the third round. This fight earned him the Performance of Night award.

Anders was tabbed as a short notice replacement for Jimi Manuwa, and faced Thiago Santos in a light heavyweight bout at UFC Fight Night 137. Anders lost via referee stoppage TKO when he collapsed and failed to make it to his corner at the conclusion of round three. This fight earned him the Fight of the Night award.

Making a quick turnaround to the Octagon, Anders returned to middleweight to replace Antônio Carlos Júnior in a bout against Elias Theodorou at UFC 231 on December 8, 2018. He lost the fight via split decision.

Anders faced Khalil Rountree Jr. on April 13, 2019, at UFC 236. He lost the fight via unanimous decision.

Anders faced Vinicius Moreira, replacing Roman Dolidze, on June 29, 2019, at UFC on ESPN 3. He won the fight via knockout in the first round. This fight earned him the Performance of the Night award.

Anders faced Gerald Meerschaert in a middleweight bout on October 12, 2019, at UFC Fight Night 161. He won the fight via split decision.

Anders was scheduled to face Krzysztof Jotko on April 11, 2020, at UFC Fight Night: Overeem vs. Harris. Due to the COVID-19 pandemic, the event was eventually postponed to May 16, 2020, at UFC on ESPN: Overeem vs. Harris. He lost the fight via unanimous decision.

Anders was scheduled to face Antônio Arroyo, replacing Andreas Michailidis, on November 14, 2020, at UFC Fight Night 183. Anders was cornering his teammate, Walt Harris on Fight Island in UFC 254 when he got the call to step in for Michailidis. At the weigh-ins, Anders weighed in at 187.5 pounds, one and a half pounds over the middleweight non-title fight limit. Anders eventually pulled out of the fight the next day as consequence of the weigh-cut and his bout was canceled.

Anders faced Darren Stewart on March 13, 2021, at UFC Fight Night 187.  Due to an illegal knee thrown by Anders in round one, the fight was declared a no contest.

Anders faced Darren Stewart at light heavyweight in a rematch on June 12, 2021, at UFC 263. He won the fight via unanimous decision.

Anders was scheduled to face Roman Dolidze on November 13, 2021, at UFC Fight Night 197. However, Anders was pulled the event for undisclosed reasons, and he was replaced by Kyle Daukaus.

Anders faced André Muniz, replacing injured Dricus Du Plessis, on December 11, 2021, at UFC 269. He lost the fight via an armbar submission in the first round.

Anders faced Jun Yong Park on May 21, 2022, at UFC Fight Night 206. He lost the bout via split decision.

Anders faced Kyle Daukaus on December 3, 2022 at UFC on ESPN 42. He won the bout via TKO stoppage in the second round.

Anders is scheduled to face Marc-André Barriault on June 10, 2023, at UFC 289.

Personal life
Anders is married with two sons.

Entertainment career
In 2022, Anders made his acting debut as a MMA fighter in episode 2 of season 5 of the Netflix series Cobra Kai.

Championships and accomplishments
Ultimate Fighting Championship
Performance of the Night (Two times) vs. Tim Williams and Vinicius Moreira
Fight of the Night (One time) vs. Thiago Santos
MMAjunkie.com
2017 Under-the-Radar Fighter of the Year
Legacy Fighting Alliance
LFA Middleweight Championship (One time)
National Collegiate Athletic Association
BCS National Championship (2009)

Mixed martial arts record

|-
|Win
|align=center|15–7 (1)
|Kyle Daukaus
|TKO (punches)
|UFC on ESPN: Thompson vs. Holland
|
|align=center|2
|align=center|2:45
|Orlando, Florida, United States
|
|-
|Loss
|align=center|14–7 (1)
|Jun Yong Park
|Decision (split)
|UFC Fight Night: Holm vs. Vieira
|
|align=center|3
|align=center|5:00
|Las Vegas, Nevada, United States
|
|-
|Loss
|align=center|14–6 (1)
|André Muniz
|Submission (armbar)
|UFC 269
|
|align=center|1
|align=center|3:13
|Las Vegas, Nevada, United States
|
|-
|Win
|align=center|14–5 (1)
|Darren Stewart
|Decision (unanimous)
|UFC 263
|
|align=center|3
|align=center|5:00
|Glendale, Arizona, United States
|
|-
|NC
|align=center|13–5 (1)
|Darren Stewart
|NC (illegal knee)
|UFC Fight Night: Edwards vs. Muhammad
|
|align=center|1
|align=center|4:37
|Las Vegas, Nevada, United States
|
|-
|Loss
|align=center|13–5
|Krzysztof Jotko
|Decision (unanimous)
|UFC on ESPN: Overeem vs. Harris
|
|align=center|3
|align=center|5:00
|Jacksonville, Florida, United States
|
|-
|Win
|align=center|13–4
|Gerald Meerschaert
|Decision (split)
|UFC Fight Night: Joanna vs. Waterson
|
|align=center|3
|align=center|5:00
|Tampa, Florida, United States
|
|-
|Win
|align=center|12–4
|Vinicius Moreira
|KO (punches)
|UFC on ESPN: Ngannou vs. dos Santos
|
|align=center|1
|align=center|1:18
|Minneapolis, Minnesota, United States
|
|-
|Loss
|align=center|11–4
|Khalil Rountree Jr.
|Decision (unanimous)
|UFC 236
|
|align=center|3
|align=center|5:00
|Atlanta, Georgia, United States
|
|-
|Loss
|align=center|11–3
|Elias Theodorou
|Decision (split)
|UFC 231
|
|align=center|3
|align=center|5:00
|Toronto, Ontario, Canada
|
|-
|Loss
|align=center|11–2
|Thiago Santos
|TKO (referee stoppage)
|UFC Fight Night: Santos vs. Anders
|
|align=center|3
|align=center|5:00
|São Paulo, Brazil
|
|-
|Win
|align=center|11–1
|Tim Williams
|KO (head kick)
|UFC Fight Night: Gaethje vs. Vick
|
|align=center|3
|align=center|4:42
|Lincoln, Nebraska, United States
|
|-
|Loss
|align=center|10–1
|Lyoto Machida
|Decision (split)
|UFC Fight Night: Machida vs. Anders
|
|align=center|5
|align=center|5:00
|Belém, Brazil
|
|-
|Win
|align=center|10–0
|Markus Perez
|Decision (unanimous)
|UFC Fight Night: Swanson vs. Ortega
|
|align=center|3
|align=center|5:00
|Fresno, California, United States
|
|-
|Win
|align=center|9–0
|Rafael Natal
|KO (punches)
|UFC on Fox: Weidman vs. Gastelum
|
|align=center|1
|align=center|2:54
|Uniondale, New York, United States
|
|-
|Win
|align=center|8–0
|Brendan Allen
|Decision (unanimous)
|LFA 14
|
|align=center|5
|align=center|5:00
|Houston, Texas, United States
|
|-
|Win
|align=center|7–0
|Jon Kirk
|TKO (punches)
|LFA 6
|
|align=center|1
|align=center|1:35
|San Antonio, Texas, United States
|
|-
|Win
|align=center|6–0
|Brian White
|TKO (punches)
|Bellator 162
|
|align=center|1
|align=center|0:23
|Memphis, Tennessee, United States
|
|-
|Win
|align=center|5–0
|Jesse Grun
|TKO (punches)
|Valor Fights 37: Grun vs. Anders
|
|align=center|1
|align=center|3:18
|Cleveland, Tennessee, United States
|
|-
|Win
|align=center|4–0
|Dekaire Sanders
|Submission (rear-naked choke)
|V3 Fights: Sanders vs. Anders
|
|align=center|1
|align=center|0:33
|Memphis, Tennessee, United States
|
|-
|Win
|align=center|3–0
|Garrick James
|TKO (punches)
|Strike Hard Productions 42
|
|align=center|3
|align=center|4:07
|Tuscaloosa, Alabama, United States
|
|-
|Win
|align=center|2–0
|Demarcus Sharpe
|Decision (unanimous)
|SFC - Southern Explosion 1
|
|align=center|3
|align=center|5:00
|Montgomery, Alabama, United States
|
|-
|Win
|align=center|1–0
|Josh Rasberry
|TKO (punches)
|Strike Hard Productions 40
|
|align=center|1
|align=center|0:40
|Tuscaloosa, Alabama, United States
|
|-

References

External links
 
 

1987 births
Living people
Sportspeople from Birmingham, Alabama
People from Pampanga
American male mixed martial artists
Mixed martial artists utilizing kickboxing
Mixed martial artists utilizing Brazilian jiu-jitsu
Alabama Crimson Tide football players
Ultimate Fighting Championship male fighters
American practitioners of Brazilian jiu-jitsu
American football linebackers
Players of American football from Birmingham, Alabama
Competitors at the 2022 World Games